Events from the year 1761 in Ireland.

Incumbent
Monarch: George III

Events
10 November – Protestant "manifesto of intolerance" ("Black Petition") against Roman Catholics signed in Galway.

Births
20 July – Arthur Gore, 3rd Earl of Arran, politician (died 1837).
17 September – Samuel Neilson, one of the founder members of the Society of United Irishmen and the founder of its newspaper the Northern Star (died 1803).
21 November – Dorothea Jordan (née Bland), actress and royal mistress (died 1816 in France).
Full date unknown
Michael Byrne, signed as an able seaman by Captain Bligh on HMS Bounty, primarily to play the fiddle.

Deaths
7 January – Darkey Kelly, brothel-keeper, burned at the stake for murder.
10 September – William Blakeney, 1st Baron Blakeney, soldier (born 1672).

References

 
Years of the 18th century in Ireland
Ireland
1760s in Ireland